SS Kooroongaba was a vehicle ferry built for Sydney Ferries Limited. It later operated in Newcastle.

History
Kooroongaba was built by the Walsh Island Dockyard & Engineering Works, Newcastle for Sydney Ferries Limited to operate vehicle ferry services from Circular Quay to Jeffrey Street. Made redundant by the opening of the Sydney Harbour Bridge in 1932, Kooroongabba was then used as a cargo carrier.

It was then sold to the Department of Main Roads and moved to Newcastle to operate as a vehicle ferry between Kooragang and Stockton. It remained in service until replaced by the Stockton Bridge in November 1971. It was sold in 1972 to the Philippines but sank off Crowdy Head while under tow.

References

External links

Ferries of New South Wales
Ferry transport in Sydney
Iron and steel steamships of Australia
Ships built in New South Wales
Shipwrecks of the Mid North Coast Region
1921 ships